An American in Paris is a 1951 American musical comedy film inspired by the 1928 orchestral composition An American in Paris by George Gershwin. Starring Gene Kelly, Leslie Caron (her film debut), Oscar Levant, Georges Guétary, and Nina Foch, the film is set in Paris, and was directed by Vincente Minnelli from a script by Alan Jay Lerner. The music is by George Gershwin, with lyrics by his brother Ira, with additional music by Johnny Green, and Saul Chaplin, the music directors.

The story of the film is interspersed with dance numbers choreographed by Gene Kelly and set to Gershwin's music. MGM executive Arthur Freed bought the Gershwin musical catalog from George's brother Ira in the late 1940s, since George died in 1937. Some of the tunes in this catalog were included in the movie, such as "I Got Rhythm" and "Love Is Here to Stay". Other songs in the movie include "I'll Build A Stairway to Paradise" and 'S Wonderful". The climax of the film is "The American in Paris" ballet, a 17-minute dialogue-free dance featuring Kelly and Caron set to Gershwin's An American in Paris. The ballet sequence cost almost half a million dollars to shoot. It was filmed on 44 sets in MGM's back lot. According to Leslie Caron in a 2009 interview on Paul O'Grady's interview show the film ran into controversy with the Hays Office over part of her dance sequence with a chair; the censor viewing the scene called it "sexually provocative", which surprised Caron, who answered "What can you do with a chair?"

An American in Paris was an enormous success, garnering eight Academy Award nominations and winning six (including Best Picture), as well as earning other industry honors. In 1993, it was selected for preservation by the United States Library of Congress in the National Film Registry for being "culturally, historically, or aesthetically significant". It is ranked number nine among AFI's Greatest Movie Musicals.

Plot
American World War II veteran Jerry Mulligan lives in Paris trying to succeed as an artist. His friend and neighbor Adam Cook is a struggling concert pianist and longtime associate of French singer Henri Baurel. At the ground-floor bar in their building, Henri tells Adam about his girlfriend, Lise Bouvier. Jerry then joins them before going out to try and sell his art.

Lonely heiress Milo Roberts notices Jerry displaying his work in Montmartre. She buys two paintings, then brings Jerry to her apartment to pay him. Jerry accepts an invitation to her dinner party for that evening, and on the way home, he sings "I Got Rhythm" with some local children. Upon discovering he is Milo's sole dinner guest, an offended Jerry says he is uninterested in being a paid escort. Milo insists she only wants to support his career.

At a crowded bar, Milo offers to sponsor an art show for Jerry. Milo's friends show up and while everyone is talking, Jerry notices a beautiful young girl at the next table. He pretends they know each other and asks her to dance, unaware it is Lise, the girl Henri loves. When Jerry wants her phone number, Lise, uninterested, gives a fake one. Someone at her table misunderstands and says the correct number. Milo, upset that Jerry flirted with another girl in her presence, wants to leave and later criticizes him for being rude.

The next day, Jerry calls Lise, but she refuses to see him. Meanwhile, Milo has arranged a showing with a collector interested in Jerry's work. Before the meeting, Jerry goes to the parfumerie where Lise works. She agrees to a late dinner, but wants to avoid public places; they share a romantic song and dance along the banks of the Seine River. She then rushes off to meet Henri after his performance ("I'll Build a Stairway to Paradise"). Henri tells Lise he is going on tour in America and proposes marriage to her.

Later, Adam humorously daydreams he is performing Gershwin's Concerto in F for Piano and Orchestra in a concert hall. As the scene progresses, Adam is also the conductor, other musicians, and even an audience member enthusiastically applauding at the end.

Milo rents Jerry an art studio and says she is planning an exhibition of his work in three months time. Jerry initially refuses the studio, but accepts on condition he will repay Milo when his work sells. After a month of courting, Jerry brings Lise to his apartment building. Jerry is confused when Lise takes off in the taxi in which she was waiting. He complains about it to Adam, who realizes that Henri and Jerry love the same girl. Henri and Jerry later discuss the girl they each love ('S Wonderful") without realizing it is Lise.

That night, Jerry and Lise reunite by the Seine. Lise says she and Henri are to be married and going to America. Lise feels duty-bound to Henri for protecting her during the war. Jerry and Lise proclaim their love for each other before parting.

A dejected Jerry invites Milo to the art students' masked ball, where they run into Henri and Lise. Jerry admits to Milo that he loves Lise. When Henri overhears Jerry and Lise saying goodbye, he realizes the truth. As Henri and Lise drive away, Jerry fantasizes through a diverse and extended dance scene with Lise, all over Paris, and set to George Gershwin's An American in Paris. A car horn breaks Jerry's reverie; Henri returns Lise to him. They embrace and walk off together as the Gershwin composition (and the film) ends.

Cast
 Gene Kelly as Jerry Mulligan
 Leslie Caron as Lise Bouvier
 Oscar Levant as Adam Cook
 Georges Guétary as Henri "Hank" Baurel
 Nina Foch as Milo Roberts
 Eugene Borden as Georges Mattieu

Hayden Rorke, best known for playing Dr. Alfred Bellows on the TV series I Dream of Jeannie (1965–1970), has an uncredited part as a friend of Milo. Noel Neill, who had already portrayed Lois Lane in the two Columbia Pictures forties Superman serials, and would later do so again on the TV series The Adventures of Superman, has a small role as an American art student who tries to criticize Jerry's paintings. Jazz musician Benny Carter plays the leader of a jazz ensemble performing in the club where Milo first takes Jerry.

Madge Blake, best known for playing Dick Grayson's aunt Harriet Cooper on the TV series Batman (1966–1968), and for her role as Larry Mondello's mother, Margaret Mondello, on the CBS/ABC sitcom Leave It to Beaver, has an uncredited  part as a customer in the perfume shop in which Lise works. Judy Landon, better known for her appearance in Kelly's next musical Singin' in the Rain (and as the wife of Brian Keith), and Sue Casey appear as dancers in the "Stairway to Paradise" sequence.

Dudley Field Malone plays an uncredited Winston Churchill.

Music and dance

 "Embraceable You" – Lise
 "Nice Work If You Can Get It" – Hank
 "By Strauss" – Jerry, Hank, Adam
 "I Got Rhythm" – Jerry
 "Tra-la-la (This Time It's Really Love)" – Jerry, Adam
 "Love Is Here to Stay" – Jerry, Lise
 "I'll Build a Stairway to Paradise" – Hank
 Concerto in F for Piano and Orchestra – Adam, The MGM Symphony Orchestra
 'S Wonderful" – Jerry, Hank
 An American in Paris Ballet – Jerry, Lise, Ensemble

The 17-minute ballet sequence, with sets and costumes referencing French painters including Raoul Dufy, Pierre-Auguste Renoir, Maurice Utrillo, Henri Rousseau, and Toulouse-Lautrec, is the climax of the film, and cost the studio approximately $450,000 to produce. Some of the backdrops for this sequence measured 300 feet wide and 40 feet high. Production on the film was halted on September15, 1950. Minnelli left to direct another film, Father's Little Dividend. Upon completion of that film in late October, he returned to film the ballet sequence.

Reception
Bosley Crowther of The New York Times gave a mostly positive review largely on the strength of the closing dance number which he called "one of the finest ever put upon the screen", as well as Leslie Caron's performance, writing that the film "takes on its own glow of magic when Miss Caron is on the screen. When she isn't, it bumps along slowly as a patched-up, conventional music show." Variety called the film "one of the most imaginative musical confections turned out by Hollywood in years ... Kelly is the picture's top star and rates every inch of his billing. His diversified dancing is great as ever and his thesping is standout." Harrison's Reports deemed it "an excellent entertainment, a delight to the eye and ear, presented in a way that will give all types of audiences extreme pleasure". Richard L. Coe of The Washington Post called it "the best musical movie I've ever seen", praising its "spirit of crisp originality and sophistication rarely found in a screen musical". John McCarten of The New Yorker called it "a thoroughly pleasant musical film ... Never too tightly confined by its slender story, An American in Paris skips from love in the moonlight to handsome ballets with the greatest of ease, and Mr. Kelly is always ready, willing, and able to execute a tap dance." The Monthly Film Bulletin called it "merely a good musical, far more attractive than most, but considerably less than the material seemed to promise. This is due in part to unimaginative use of the Paris settings—a very obvious tourist's view—and to the rather curious way in which the story, after building up interest in Jerry's painting and in his one-man show, simply shelves the whole issue."

Reviewing the film in 2011, James Berardinelli wrote that it "falls into the category of a weak Oscar winner. The movie is enjoyable enough to watch, but it represents a poor choice as the standard-bearer of the 1951 roster ... It's a fine, fun film with a lot of great songs and dancing but there's nothing about this production that causes it to stand out when compared to one of dozens of musicals from the era."

Rotten Tomatoes gives An American in Paris a rating of 95% from 100 reviews. The consensus summarizes: "The plot may be problematic, but such concerns are rendered superfluous by Gene Kelly and Leslie Caron's star power, the Gershwins' classic songs, and Vincente Minnelli's colorful, sympathetic direction."

Box office
According to MGM records, the film earned $3,750,000 in the U.S. and Canada and $3,231,000 in other countries during its initial theatrical release. This resulted in the studio making a $1,346,000 profit.

Awards and honors

Gene Kelly received an Academy Honorary Award that year for "his versatility as an actor, singer, director and dancer, and specifically for his brilliant achievements in the art of choreography on film". It was his only Oscar.

In 1993, An American in Paris was selected for preservation in the United States National Film Registry as being "culturally, historically, or aesthetically significant".

American Film Institute recognition
 1998: AFI's 100 Years...100 Movies – #68
 2002: AFI's 100 Years...100 Passions – #39
 2004: AFI's 100 Years...100 Songs – #32
 "I Got Rhythm"
 2006: AFI's Greatest Movie Musicals – #9

AFI also honored star Kelly as #15 of the top 25 American male screen legends.

Digital restoration
In 2011, the film was digitally restored by Warner Bros. for its 60th anniversary.

Stage adaptations

2008 adaptation
A stage version of the musical was adapted by Ken Ludwig, and began previews at the Alley Theatre (Houston) on April29, 2008, officially opening on May 18 and running through June22. The production, directed by Alley artistic director Gregory Boyd with choreography by Randy Skinner, starred Harry Groener and Kerry O'Malley. The musical had many of the film's original songs, and also incorporated other Gershwin songs, such as "They All Laughed", "Let's Call the Whole Thing Off", and "Love Walked In".

2014 adaptation

In 2014, a stage adaptation premiered in Paris at the Théâtre du Châtelet, with Robert Fairchild as Jerry Mulligan and Leanne Cope as Lise Bouvier (here renamed Lise Dassin and turned into an aspiring ballet dancer).  The production, which ran from November to January 2015, was directed and choreographed by Christopher Wheeldon, written by Craig Lucas and designed by Bob Crowley. The musical then transferred to Broadway, with previews at Palace Theatre beginning on March13, 2015, before officially opening there on April12.

In popular culture
The epilogue of the 2016 musical film La La Land references the set design and costuming of An American in Paris, which director Damien Chazelle called "a movie that we just pillaged".

References

External links

 
 
 
 
 
 Filmsite.org's Greatest Films An American in Paris
 Combustible Celluloid's review of An American in Paris
Production art from An American in Paris, Margaret Herrick Library, Academy of Motion Picture Arts and Sciences
 An American in Paris essay by Daniel Eagan in America's Film Legacy: The Authoritative Guide to the Landmark Movies in the National Film Registry A&C Black, 2010 , pages 450-451 

1951 films
1951 romantic comedy films
1950s American films
1950s English-language films
1950s romantic musical films
American romantic musical films
American romantic comedy films
Best Musical or Comedy Picture Golden Globe winners
Best Picture Academy Award winners
Films about fictional painters
Films adapted into plays
Films awarded an Academy Honorary Award
Films directed by Vincente Minnelli
Films produced by Arthur Freed
Films scored by Johnny Green
Films scored by Saul Chaplin
Films set in France
Films set in Paris
Films shot in France
Films shot in Paris
Films that won the Best Costume Design Academy Award
Films that won the Best Original Score Academy Award
Films whose art director won the Best Art Direction Academy Award
Films whose cinematographer won the Best Cinematography Academy Award
Films whose writer won the Best Original Screenplay Academy Award
Films with screenplays by Alan Jay Lerner
George Gershwin in film
Jukebox musical films
Metro-Goldwyn-Mayer films
United States National Film Registry films